Thomas Jefferson Junior High School may refer to:

 Thomas Jefferson Junior High School, Woodridge, Illinois
 Thomas Jefferson Junior High School, Kearns, Utah
 Thomas Jefferson Junior High School, Arlington, Virginia, now Thomas Jefferson Middle School 
 Thomas Jefferson Junior High School, Washington DC, opened 1940, now Jefferson Middle School Academy